Judah Cooks is a retired American soccer midfielder and former coach of the D.C. United Academy U-18 team. He played professionally in Major League Soccer and the USL A-League and was a member of the United States men's national under-17 soccer team at the 1993 FIFA U-17 World Championship.

Youth
Cooks graduated from Walt Whitman High School where he was a two-time high school All-American soccer player.  In addition to his outstanding high school career, Cooks also played all four games for the United States men's national under-17 soccer team at the 1993 FIFA U-17 World Championship, scoring four goals.  Cooks signed a letter of intent to attend and play soccer at Rutgers University. In the fall of 1995, Cooks entered the University of Maryland. Cooks played two seasons with the Terps (1996–1997) before leaving school early to turn professional.  His younger brother Micah Cooks also played professionally at D.C. United, both of them playing on the same team from 2000 through 2001.

Professional
In January 1998, Cooks signed a Project-40 contract with Major League Soccer.  The league then placed him with D.C. United.  In 1998 and 1999, Cooks played for both Project 40 in the USISL A-League and D.C. United in MLS.  On May 4, 2001, United waived Cooks.  He signed with the Charleston Battery of the USL A-League.  In June 2001, the Battery sent him on loan to the Miami Fusion for one game.  Cooks played five games for the Battery, then moved to the Milwaukee Rampage at the end of the season.  In 2002, he played for the Atlanta Silverbacks and in 2003 for the Syracuse Salty Dogs.

Coaching 
In February 2017, Cooks joined Washington Capital United as the technical director of coaching after serving as coaching at Weston FC in Florida.

Honours

Club
D.C. United
MLS Cup: 1999

References

External links
 D.C. United: Judah Cooks
 Charleston Battery: Judah Cooks
 FIFA: Judah Cooks
 

Living people
1976 births
People from Bethesda, Maryland
American soccer coaches
American soccer players
Atlanta Silverbacks players
Charleston Battery players
D.C. United players
Major League Soccer players
Miami Fusion players
Milwaukee Rampage players
Maryland Terrapins men's soccer players
Syracuse Salty Dogs players
A-League (1995–2004) players
United States men's youth international soccer players
MLS Pro-40 players
D.C. United non-playing staff
Soccer players from Maryland
Association football midfielders